This article documents the chronology of the response to the COVID-19 pandemic in May 2022, which originated in Wuhan, China in December 2019. Some developments may become known or fully understood only in retrospect. Reporting on this pandemic began in December 2019.

Reactions and measures in the United Nations

Reactions and measures in Africa

Reactions and measures in the Americas

Reactions and measures in the Eastern Mediterranean

Reactions and measures in Europe

11 May
The European Union Aviation Safety Agency (EASA) has announced plans to lift facemask requirements for flights and airports throughout the European Union in mid-May 2022.

Reactions and measures in South, East and Southeast Asia

Reactions and measures in the Western Pacific

3 May
New Zealand's COVID-19 Response Minister Chris Hipkins announced that unvaccinated visa holders, permanent residents, and Australian citizens residing in New Zealand would be able to travel to and from New Zealand without entering Managed Isolation and Quarantine (MIQ) facilities. 
The New Zealand Government announced that the country's four remaining MIQ facilities would close by August 2022 due to the low number of people using them.

11 May
Prime Minister of New Zealand Jacinda Ardern announced that the country's border would reopen for all work visas on 4 July and to all visitor and student visa and cruise ships on 31 July.

See also 

 Timeline of the COVID-19 pandemic in May 2022
 Responses to the COVID-19 pandemic

References 

May 2022 events
Timelines of the COVID-19 pandemic in 2022
Responses to the COVID-19 pandemic in 2022